Only Angels Have Wings is a 1939 American adventure drama film directed by Howard Hawks, starring Cary Grant and Jean Arthur, and is based on a story written by Hawks. Its plot follows the manager of an air freight company in a remote South American port town who is forced to risk his pilots' lives while vying for a major contract. It features supporting performances from Thomas Mitchell, Richard Barthelmess, Noah Beery Jr., and Rita Hayworth in her first major role.

Released by Columbia Pictures in May 1939, the film is generally regarded as being among Hawks' finest films, particularly in its portrayal of the professionalism of the pilots of the film, its atmosphere, and the flying sequences.

In 2017, the film was selected for preservation in the United States National Film Registry by the Library of Congress as being "culturally, historically, or aesthetically significant".

Plot

Geoff Carter is the head pilot and manager of Barranca Airways, a small, barely solvent company owned by "Dutchy" Van Ruyter carrying airmail from the fictional South American port town of Barranca through a high pass in the Andes Mountains. Bonnie Lee, a piano-playing entertainer, arrives on a banana boat one day. After making her acquaintance, Joe Souther crashes and dies trying to land in fog later that day.  Bonnie becomes infatuated with Geoff, despite his fatalistic attitude about the dangerous flying, and stays on in Barranca (not at his invitation, as he insists on telling her).

The situation is complicated by the arrival of pilot Bat MacPherson and his wife (and Geoff's old flame) Judy. McPherson cannot find work in the United States because he once bailed out of an airplane, leaving his mechanic—the brother of "Kid" Dabb, Carter's best friend—to die in the ensuing crash.  When Geoff is forced to ground the Kid because of failing eyesight, he hires MacPherson on the understanding that he will get the most dangerous assignments.

Dutchy will secure a lucrative government contract if he can provide reliable mail service during a six-month trial. On the last day of the probation period, bad weather closes the mountain pass. Geoff decides to try to fly a new Ford Trimotor over the mountains instead. The Kid asks to go with him as co-pilot. Geoff refuses, but then lets the Kid toss a coin to decide the matter. When it lands on the floor, Geoff discovers that the coin has two heads. Geoff still agrees to take him along. Just before leaving, Bonnie tries to talk Geoff out of going.  She takes his gun out of his holster and points it at him.  When she realizes that she cannot stop him, she drops the gun on the table, but it accidentally fires, hitting Geoff in the shoulder.

Unable to fly, Geoff lets MacPherson take his place. However, MacPherson and the Kid are unable to climb high enough; the plane stalls and drops thousands of feet before leveling off. Geoff tells them to turn around, but they decide to try to fly through the fogged-in pass. In the pass, they encounter a flock of condors. One crashes through the windshield, paralyzing the Kid; another hits the No. 1 engine, setting it on fire. Later the No. 2 engine also catches fire. The Kid tells MacPherson to bail out, but he refuses. He turns around and returns to Barranca, managing to crash-land the burning Trimotor on the field. The Kid dies from a broken neck, but not before telling Geoff what MacPherson did. As a result, MacPherson is finally accepted by the other pilots.

Bonnie is torn between leaving and staying, and confronts Geoff in the hope he will ask her to stay. However, with mere hours to spare on the trial period, the weather clears and Geoff has to rush off to secure the all-important contract. Before he goes, he offers to toss a coin to decide: heads, Bonnie stays; tails, she leaves. The coin comes up heads, but Bonnie despairs that this is the result of chance, not love. Geoff leaves her with the coin. She then realizes that it is the Kid's trick coin, dispelling her sadness.

Cast

 Cary Grant as Geoff Carter
 Jean Arthur as Bonnie Lee
 Richard Barthelmess as Bat MacPherson
 Rita Hayworth as Judy MacPherson
 Thomas Mitchell as "Kid" Dabb
 Allyn Joslyn as Les Peters
 Sig Ruman as John "Dutchy" Van Ruyter
 Victor Kilian as "Sparks" Reynolds
 John Carroll as "Gent" Shelton

 Don Barry as "Tex" Gordon
 Noah Beery Jr. as Joe Souther
 Manuel Álvarez Maciste as the singer
 Milissa Sierra as Lily
 Lucio Villegas as Doctor
 Pat Flaherty as Mike
 Pedro Regas as Pancho
 Pat West as Baldy

Production

Pre-production and casting
The film's original script outline was written by Anne Wigton; the working title originally was Plane No. 4. Howard Hawks re-wrote the film's scenario himself, based on a story that he wrote in 1938 titled Plane from Barranca. While he was scouting locations several years earlier, for the filming of Viva Villa!, Hawks had been especially inspired by the stoic aviation personnel that he had met in Mexico. The film's final script was written and re-written throughout the film's production, mostly by Hawks and Jules Furthman, but also with contributions by Eleanore Griffin and William Rankin.

Hawks had previously worked with Cary Grant the year before on Bringing Up Baby and this was the second of five collaborations between the director and star.

He cast Jean Arthur in the leading role of Bonnie Lee after appraising her acting in several films directed by Frank Capra.

Hawks then hired silent film star Richard Barthelmess for the role of Bat MacPherson. Barthelmess's career had gradually diminished since sound films became popular in the late 1920s, and he was a controversial choice, mainly because he had recently had a botched plastic surgery operation on the skin under his eyes that resulted in permanent X-shaped scars under both of his eyes. Barthelmess usually wore heavy make-up to hide the scars, but Hawks wanted to use the scars for the character.

Hawks had originally cast Dorothy Comingore in the role of Judy MacPherson, but studio head Harry Cohn had been grooming a young starlet that would be advanced for the role. With backing from Cohn, her agent then insisted that Hawks give Rita Hayworth a screen test, which eventually resulted in Hayworth being cast in the role.

Filming
Shooting of Only Angels Have Wings began on December 19, 1938 at the Columbia Studio Ranch and Hawks shot the film in chronological sequence whenever possible. Hawks and Arthur initially found working together difficult and Arthur would often argue with Hawks on set. Hawks was attempting to coach Arthur to play a variation of the classical "Hawksian Woman Archetype", but Arthur often felt uncomfortable with his direction. Eventually, she unhappily agreed to play the role as he directed her. Years later after Arthur saw Lauren Bacall's performance in To Have and Have Not, Arthur apologized to Hawks and told him that she finally understood what he had wanted from her (epitomized in Bacall's repetition and emphasis on the paradoxical line "I'm hard to get ... all you have to do is ask me.") Hawks later said that he considered Arthur to have been good in the film.

Initial shooting was completed on March 24, 1939, 31 days over its shooting schedule. This was followed with several weeks of second unit shooting of aircraft flying in various locations in the western United States. A few re-takes were shot in April with Cary Grant and Victor Kilian. Two days of re-shoots with Rita Hayworth were also shot, but were directed by Charles Vidor.

In a 1972 interview, Arthur revealed, "I loved sinking my head into Cary Grant's chest".

Aircraft used in the production
The "cast" also starred a Ford Trimotor  as well as a Hamilton H-47 Metalplane, and Travel Air 6000 single engine monoplanes. All of these types accurately represented the types of aircraft flying in the period depicted by the film. The Metalplane was the airplane Joe Souther crashes while trying to land in heavy fog, and was only used for ground shots. In 2007, one of the Hamilton props used in the simulated flying scenes for this aircraft surfaced on an episode of Antiques Roadshow; its owner had been able to screen match it, confirming its authenticity.  The Travel Air was used in the exciting mine rescue flying scene, while the Ford Trimotor was featured in another dramatic landing that ends in a fiery crash.  Midway through the film, Paul Mantz flew a Boeing Model 40 biplane in a spirited aerobatic performance, reprising his earlier scene in Flight from Glory. Only Angels Have Wings has become very popular among enthusiasts of the aircraft of the golden age of aviation.

Release and reception
Twelve days after the film's final re-shoots were completed, Only Angels Have Wings premiered in Los Angeles at the Pantages Theater on May 10, 1939. Its official world premiere occurred the next day at Radio City Music Hall. It was heavily promoted by Columbia Studios and ended up making $143,000 on its initial two-week run at radio City Music Hall, and earned over one million dollars overall. It was the third-highest-grossing film of 1939. The film was also Rita Hayworth's breakout role and helped make her a major Hollywood star, with Hayworth appearing on the cover of Look magazine after the film's success.

Only Angels Have Wings received good reviews on its release, with Abel Green of Variety comparing it favorably to Flight From Glory and praised Barthelmess's performance. Frank S. Nugent in his review for The New York Times focused on the excitement found in the aerial scenes, also recognizing the talents of the star-studded cast, "Mr. Hawks has staged his flying sequences brilliantly ... He has made proper use of the amiable performing talents of Mr. Grant, Miss Arthur, Thomas Mitchell, Mr. Barthelmess, Sig Rumann and the rest."

Only Angels have Wings was later selected as one of 12 films representing the U.S. at the first Cannes Film Festival. However, the festival was canceled in light of events leading up to World War II.

On Metacritic, the film holds a score of 86 out of 100, based on 10 critics, indicating "universal acclaim."

Radio adaptations
Two weeks after the film's premiere, Only Angels Have Wings was adapted as a one-hour radio play for the May 29, 1939 broadcast of Lux Radio Theatre. The film's principal actors, Cary Grant, Jean Arthur, Rita Hayworth, Richard Barthelmess and Thomas Mitchell all reprised their roles. Orson Welles headlined a radio adaptation on The Campbell Playhouse on February 25, 1940, that starred Welles and Joan Blondell.

Awards and honors
Roy Davidson and Edwin C. Hahn were nominated for the first-time Best Effects, Special Effects.

Legacy
Only Angels Have Wings has become thought of as one of Hawks's best films, with Dave Kehr calling it the "equilibrium point" of Hawks's career, bridging themes developed in his early films of the 1930s to some of his darker films of the 1940s and 1950s. Film critics at Cahiers du Cinéma also praised the film in the 1950s as a quintessential support of the auteur theory.

American film critic Mike D’Angelo has cited Only Angels Have Wings as his favorite film of all time, gifting a rare 100/100 rating and describing the film as “a tour de force of shifting dynamics.”

See also
 List of misquotations: In one scene, Cary Grant calls after Hayworth's character by saying, "Judy, Judy." This is the closest he ever came on film to the misquotation associated with him: "Judy, Judy, Judy".
 List of films with a 100% rating on Rotten Tomatoes, a film review aggregator website

References

Informational notes

Citations

Bibliography

External links

 
 
 
 
 "Judy, Judy, Judy" FAQ
 Only Angels Have Wings: Hawks’s Genius Takes Flight an essay by Michael Sragow at the Criterion Collection

Streaming audio
 Only Angels Have Wings on Lux Radio Theater: May 29, 1939
 Only Angels Have Wings on The Campbell Playhouse: February 25, 1940

1939 films
1939 drama films
American drama films
American aviation films
American black-and-white films
1930s English-language films
Films scored by Dimitri Tiomkin
Films directed by Howard Hawks
Films set in South America
Films adapted into radio programs
Films with screenplays by Jules Furthman
Films shot in Utah
United States National Film Registry films
Films about postal systems
Columbia Pictures films
1930s American films